Lac du Portillon is a lake in Pyrénées, Haute-Garonne, France. At an elevation of 2580 m, its surface area is 0.34 km².

Perdiguero Peak rises above this lake.

Portillon